Vikarabad is a town and mandal in Vikarabad district of the Indian state of Telangana. It is located in Vikarabad mandal of Vikarabad revenue division.

History 
Vikarabad was named after the fifth Paigah Amir (Premier noble) H.E. Nawab Sir Vikar-ul-Umrah Bahadur, Sikander Jung, Iqbal-ud-Daula and Iqtadar-ul-Mulk,  Nawab Muhammed Fazaluddin Khan KCIE served as prime minister of Hyderabad State and Berar Province between 1893 and 1901.

Nawab Sir Vicar-ul-Umrah was the younger son of Nawab Rasheeduddin Khan Bahadur, Shams ul Umra, Amir e Kabir IÌI, Amir e  Paigah IV and Co-Regent of Hyderabad. He built three palaces and mansions in Vikarabad, The Vikar Manzil Palace (which presently houses the deputy collector/RDO Office and still belongs to the Paigah family heirs), Sultan Manzil Palace named after his eldest son and heir, H.E. Nawab Sultan ul Mulk Bahadur the last full Amir of Vicar ul Umrahi Paigah and the "Vicar Shikargah" which he later presented as nazar or offering to his brother in law and nephew, H.H.Nawab Mir Mahboob Ali Khan, the VIth Nizam of Hyderabad.

Sir Vikar's Jagir Vikarabad, Dharur and Ananthagiri hills where know to be mini Hill station of the Deccan. He died in 1902 and is buried at the Paigah Tombs at Hyderabad.

Demographics 
 India census, Vikarabad had a population of 53,185. Males constitute 26,422 of the population and females 26,763. Vikarabad has an average literacy rate of 64%, higher than the national average of 59.5%: male literacy is 72%, and female literacy is 57%. In Vikarabad, 13% of the population is under 6 years of age.

Government and politics 
Vikarabad Municipality is the urban local body that oversees the civic needs of the town.

Politics 
Vikarabad is an assembly constituency in Telangana State. MLAs representing the town have been:
2019. Metuku Anand (Telangana Rashtra Samithi)
 2014 B. Sanjeeva Rao(Telangana Rashtra Samithi)
 2009 G. Prasad Kumar (Indian National Congress)
 2008(BY elaction) G. Prasad Kumar (Indian National Congress)
 2004 A.Chandra Shekar (Telangana Rashtra Samithi)
 1999 A. Chandra sekhar (Telugu Desam Party)
 1994 A. Chandra sekhar (Telugu Desam Party)
 1989 A. Chandra sekhar (Telugu Desam Party)
 1985 A. Chandra sekhar (Telugu Desam Party)
 1983 K.R.K. Swami (Indian National Congress)
 1978 V.B. Tirumalaiah (Indian National Congress)
 1972 V.B. Tirumalaiah (Independent)
 1967 A. Ramaswami (Indian National Congress)
 1962 A. Ramaswami (Indian National Congress)
 1957 Marri Chenna Reddy (Indian National Congress)
 1957 A. Ramaswami (Indian National Congress)
 1952 Marri Chenna Reddy (Indian National Congress)
 1952 A. Ramaswami (Indian National Congress)

Tourism 

 Ananthagiri Temple in the village of Ananthagiri, 6 km far from Vikarabad Mandal.
 Ananthagiri Hills, a forest region which is home to the Anantha Padmanabha Swamy temple. and the source of the Musi River. Telangana's second largest tuberculosis hospital is located in the Ananthagiri hills.
Kotepally dam which is situated around 20 kilometers away from Ananthagiri hills attracts over 10000 tourists in the weekends and Kayaking at Kotepally dam is a water sports activity for which tourists are sometimes made wait hours to get their turn to high influx of tourists.

Transport 
 is located on the Vikarabad–Parli section of Secunderabad railway division of South Central Railway zone.

References

External links 

Cities and towns in Vikarabad district
Mandal headquarters in Vikarabad district